Bioethics is a monthly peer-reviewed academic journal published by Wiley-Blackwell in association with the International Association of Bioethics. The editors-in-chief are Ruth Chadwick (Cardiff University) and Udo Schüklenk (Queen's University). In 2011 Bioethics celebrated 25 years of publication with a conference and a special issue of the journal.

Abstracting and indexing 
The journal is abstracted and indexed in MEDLINE, PubMed the Arts and Humanities Citation Index, Applied Social Sciences Index and Abstracts, Worldwide Political Science Abstracts, CINAHL, Current Contents/Social & Behavioral Sciences, Excerpta Medica, Philosopher's Index, PsycINFO, Science Citation Index Expanded, Social Sciences Citation Index, and Psychological Abstracts.

According to the Journal Citation Reports, the journal has a 2018 impact factor of 1.66, ranking it 10/52 of journals in the category "Ethics", 4/16 of journals in the category "Medical Ethics", 15/40 of journals in the category "Social Issues", and 18/42 of journals in the category "Social Sciences Biomedical".

Developing World Bioethics 
In 2001 a companion journal was established named Developing World Bioethics and both journals can only be obtained in a combined subscription.

See also 
 List of ethics journals

References

External links 
 

Bioethics journals
Wiley-Blackwell academic journals
English-language journals
Publications established in 1987
Monthly journals